Three ships of the Royal Navy have borne the name HMS Umpire, probably after the official in the sport of Cricket:

 HMS Umpire was a 100-gun first-rate ship of the line renamed  in 1782, before her launch, after the previous  foundered.
  was a modified  launched on 9 June 1917 and sold for breaking up on 7 January 1930.
  was a U-class submarine launched on 30 December 1940 and sunk in an accident nine days after commissioning.

Royal Navy ship names